The year 2012 in Archosaur paleontology was eventful.  Archosaurs include the only living dinosaur group — birds — and the reptile crocodilians, plus all extinct dinosaurs,  extinct crocodilian relatives, and pterosaurs. Archosaur palaeontology is the scientific study of those animals, especially as they existed before the Holocene Epoch began about 11,700 years ago.  The year 2012 in paleontology included various significant developments regarding archosaurs.

This article records new taxa of fossil archosaurs of every kind that have been described during the year 2012, as well as other significant discoveries and events related to paleontology of archosaurs that occurred in the year 2012.

Pseudosuchians

Research
 The postcranial skeleton of Sebecus icaeorhinus is described by Diego Pol et al. (2012).
 Skull anatomy of Dakosaurus and Plesiosuchus is described by Mark T. Young et al. (2012).
 Kemkemia auditorei, previously thought to be a theropod dinosaur, is reinterpreted as a member of Crocodyliformes by Gabriel Lio et al. (2012).
 A study including a supertree of Crocodyliformes is published by Mario Bronzati, Felipe Chinaglia Montefeltro and Max C. Langer (2012).
 Skull remains of a member of the genus Gavialis belonging or related to the species Gavialis bengawanicus are described from the Early Pleistocene of Thailand by Martin et al. (2012).

New taxa

Newly named basal dinosauriforms

Non-avian dinosaurs

Research
 A study including a large phylogenetic analysis of non-coelurosaurian tetanuran theropod dinosaurs is published by Matthew T. Carrano, Roger B. J. Benson and Scott D. Sampson (2012).
 A study including a systematic revision of the family Dromaeosauridae and a large phylogenetic analysis of paravian theropod dinosaurs (both avian and non-avian) is published by Alan Turner, Peter Makovicky and Mark Norell (2012).
 A specimen of Microraptor is described by Quanguo Li et al. (2012), with melanosome imprints making it possible to determine the plumage coloration and iridescence in the plumage.
 A new specimen of Austroraptor cabazai is described by Philip J. Currie and Ariana Paulina Carabajal (2012).
 A specimen of Mei long is described by Chunling Gao et al. (2012).
 A study of Khaan mckennai was published by Amy M. Balanoff and Mark Norell (2012).
 A new information on Yixianosaurus longimanus is published by T. Alexander Dececchi, Hans C. E. Larsson and David W. E. Hone (2012).
 Three specimens of Ornithomimus with evidence of feathers are described by Darla K. Zelenitsky et al. (2012).
 A new information on the anatomy of the holotype specimen of Nqwebasaurus thwazi is published by Jonah N. Choiniere, Catherine A. Forster and William J. de Klerk (2012).
 A study of Alioramus was published by Stephen Brusatte, Thomas D. Carr and Mark Norell (2012).
 Abdominal contents of two specimens of Sinocalliopteryx gigas are described by Lida Xing et al. (2012).
 A study of musculoskeletal anatomy, three-dimensional body proportions and body mass evolution in allosauroid theropod dinosaurs is published by Karl T. Bates, Roger B. J. Benson, and Peter L. Falkingham  (2012).
 A study of the braincase of Sinraptor dongi is published by Ariana Paulina Carabajal and Philip J. Currie (2012).
 A study of Kelmayisaurus petrolicus, interpreting it as likely to be a member of Carcharodontosauridae, is published by Stephen L. Brusatte, Roger B.J. Benson and Xing Xu (2012).
 Description of pectoral girdle and forelimb of Majungasaurus crenatissimus is published by Sara H. Burch and Matthew T. Carrano (2012).
 A study of Early Cretaceous Australian theropod dinosaurs was published by Roger B. J. Benson et al. (2012).
 A study including a phylogenetic analysis of titanosauriform sauropod dinosaurs is published by Michael D'Emic (2012).
 The postcranial skeletal pneumaticity in the skeletons of five taxa of early sauropodomorph dinosaurs is described by Adam M. Yates, Mathew J. Wedel and Matthew F. Bonnan (2012).
 The study on the presumed course of the recurrent laryngeal nerve in sauropod dinosaurs is published by Mathew J. Wedel (2012).
 Pachysuchus, previously thought to be an Early Jurassic phytosaur, is reinterpreted as a sauropodomorph dinosaur by Paul M. Barrett and Xu Xing (2012).
 A study of vertebral laminae of sauropod dinosaurs is published by Jeffrey A. Wilson (2012).
 A study on the neural spine bifurcation in diplodocoid sauropod dinosaurs is published by D. Cary Woodruff and Denver W. Fowler (2012).
 A study of the postcranial skeletal pneumaticity in the skeletons of Saltasaurus, Neuquensaurus and Rocasaurus is published by Ignacio A. Cerda, Leonardo Salgado and Jaime E. Powell  (2012).
 A study of Early Cretaceous sauropod dinosaurs from North America is published by Michael D. D’Emic and Brady Z. Foreman (2012). Among other findings, additional sauropod material from the Cloverly Formation of Wyoming was referred to Sauroposeidon, Paluxysaurus was synonymized with Sauroposeidon, Rugocaudia was considered a nomen dubium and the cause of the North American sauropod extinction in the middle of the Cretaceous period was discussed.
 The first sauropod dinosaur (a member of Titanosauria) from Antarctica described by Ignacio A. Cerda et al.  (2012).
 A study of biomechanics, pectoral girdle articulation and body mass of the Triassic dinosaurs from Brazil (Staurikosaurus, Saturnalia, Pampadromaeus, Guaibasaurus and Unaysaurus) is published by Rafael Delcourt, Sergio A. K. de Azevedo, Orlando N. Grillo and Fernanda O. Deantoni (2012).
 Anatomy of Fruitadens haagarorum is described by Richard J. Butler et al. (2012).
 A study including a phylogenetic analysis of ankylosaurian dinosaurs is published by Richard S. Thompson et al. (2012).
 A study including a phylogenetic analysis of iguanodontian ornithopod dinosaurs is published by Andrew T. McDonald (2012).
 A study of the forearm orientation in hadrosaurids is published by Phil Senter (2012).
 Skin impressions of two different species of Saurolophus are described by Phil Bell (2012).
 A new description of Eolambia caroljonesa is published by Andrew T. McDonald et al. (2012).
 A study of anatomy and relationships of Bolong yixianensis is published by Wu Wenhao and Pascal Godefroit (2012).
 An overview of Early Cretaceous iguanodontian ornithopod dinosaurs of England and Belgium is published by David B. Norman (2012).
 A study of the bone histology of Tenontosaurus tilletti is published by Sarah Werning (2012).
 A study of the bone histology of Dysalotosaurus lettowvorbecki is published by Tom R. Hübner (2012).
 A study questioning the interpretation of Torosaurus as a junior synonym and a growth stage of Triceratops was published by Nicholas R. Longrich and Daniel J. Field (2012).
 A study of some of the earliest known dinosaur assemblages is published by Martín D. Ezcurra (2012). Among other findings, Teyuwasu is interpreted as a member of the clade Dinosauriformes of uncertain phylogenetic placement and a nomen dubium.
 A study of anatomical variability exhibited by major dinosaur groups living during the latest Cretaceous is published by Stephen L. Brusatte et al. (2012).
 A study of biodiversity of late Maastrichtian non-avian dinosaurs is published by Jean Le Loeuff (2012).

New taxa

Newly named birds

Pterosaurs

Research
 A study on the bone histology of Rhamphorhynchus and its implications for inferring life history of members of the genus is published by Prondvai et al. (2012).

New taxa

Archosauria incertae sedis

Newly named archosaurs with uncertain affinities

References

2010s in paleontology
Paleontology
2012 in paleontology